Tzvetelina Nikolova (born 1 August 1971) is a retired professional tennis player from Bulgaria.

On 5 October 1992, she reached her highest WTA doubles ranking of 245. During her career Nikolova won a total of 4 ITF doubles titles.

Nikolova made her WTA main draw debut in 1989 at the Vitosha New Otani Open in Sofia partnering Ralitza Milorieva in the doubles event.

ITF Circuit finals

Doubles: 4 (4 titles)

External links

 
 

1971 births
Living people
Sportspeople from Plovdiv
Bulgarian female tennis players